Brando Va'aulu (born 3 May 1987) a junior product of Sunnybank Rugby Union Club. A former Samoan rugby union player whom previously played for the Reds in Super Rugby.

Career
Born in Auckland, New Zealand, Va'aulu's position of choice is as a wing. He was selected to go on the UK Tour with the Australian Schools side. He was a member of the Australian Youth Commonwealth 7s, Under 19 World Cup and Inaugural NRC winning sides.

He was the Reds Rookie of the year in 2007.

Represented Manu Samoa in 2010.

References

External links
Tokyo Gas profile (Japanese)

1987 births
People from Auckland
Australian rugby union players
Australian people of New Zealand descent
Australian sportspeople of Samoan descent
Samoa international rugby union players
Queensland Reds players
Brisbane City (rugby union) players
CS Bourgoin-Jallieu players
Rugby union wings
People educated at Brisbane State High School
Living people
Expatriate rugby union players in France
Expatriate rugby union players in Japan
Rugby union players from Auckland